A search engine is an information retrieval system designed to help find information stored on a computer system. The search results are usually presented in a list and are commonly called hits. Search engines help to minimize the time required to find information and the amount of information which must be consulted, akin to other techniques for managing information overload. 

The most public, visible form of a search engine is a Web search engine which searches for information on the World Wide Web.

How search engines work
Search engines provide an interface to a group of items that enables users to specify criteria about an item of interest and have the engine find the matching items. The criteria are referred to as a search query. In the case of text search engines, the search query is typically expressed as a set of words that identify the desired concept that one or more documents may contain. There are several styles of search query syntax that vary in strictness. It can also switch names within the search engines from previous sites. Whereas some text search engines require users to enter two or three words separated by white space, other search engines may enable users to specify entire documents, pictures, sounds, and various forms of natural language. Some search engines apply improvements to search queries to increase the likelihood of providing a quality set of items through a process known as query expansion. Query understanding methods can be used as standardize query language.

The list of items that meet the criteria specified by the query is typically sorted, or ranked. Ranking items by relevance (from highest to lowest) reduces the time required to find the desired information. Probabilistic search engines rank items based on measures of similarity (between each item and the query, typically on a scale of 1 to 0, 1 being most similar) and sometimes popularity or authority (see Bibliometrics) or use relevance feedback. Boolean search engines typically only return items which match exactly without regard to order, although the term boolean search engine may simply refer to the use of boolean-style syntax (the use of operators AND, OR, NOT, and XOR) in a probabilistic context.

To provide a set of matching items that are sorted according to some criteria quickly, a search engine will typically collect metadata about the group of items under consideration beforehand through a process referred to as indexing. The index typically requires a smaller amount of computer storage, which is why some search engines only store the indexed information and not the full content of each item, and instead provide a method of navigating to the items in the search engine result page. Alternatively, the search engine may store a copy of each item in a cache so that users can see the state of the item at the time it was indexed or for archive purposes or to make repetitive processes work more efficiently and quickly.

Other types of search engines do not store an index. Crawler, or spider type search engines (a.k.a. real-time search engines) may collect and assess items at the time of the search query, dynamically considering additional items based on the contents of a starting item (known as a seed, or seed URL in the case of an Internet crawler). Meta search engines store neither an index nor a cache and instead simply reuse the index or results of one or more other search engine to provide an aggregated, final set of results.

Database size, which had been a significant marketing feature through the early 2000s, was similarly displaced by emphasis on relevancy ranking, the methods by which search engines attempt to sort the best results first. Relevancy ranking first became a major issue circa 1996, when it became apparent that it was impractical to review full lists of results. Consequently, algorithms for relevancy ranking have continuously improved. Google's PageRank method for ordering the results has received the most press, but all major search engines continually refine their ranking methodologies with a view toward improving the ordering of results. As of 2006, search engine rankings are more important than ever, so much so that an industry has developed ("search engine optimizers", or "SEO") to help web-developers improve their search ranking, and an entire body of case law has developed around matters that affect search engine rankings, such as use of trademarks in metatags. The sale of search rankings by some search engines has also created controversy among librarians and consumer advocates.

Search engine experience for users continues to be enhanced. Google's addition of the Google Knowledge Graph has had wider ramifications for the Internet, possibly even limiting certain websites traffic, for example Wikipedia. By pulling information and presenting it on Google's page, some argue that it can negatively affect other sites. However, there have been no major concerns.

Types of search engines

 By source

Desktop search
Federated search
Human search engine
Metasearch engine
Multisearch
Search aggregator
Web search engine

 By content type

Audio search engine
Full text search
Image search
Video search engine

 By interface

Incremental search
Instant answer
Semantic search
Selection-based search
Voice Search

 By topic

Bibliographic database
Enterprise search
Medical literature retrieval
Vertical search

See also

Automatic summarization
Emanuel Goldberg (inventor of early search engine)
Index (search engine)
Inverted index
List of search engines
Search as a service
Search engine optimization
Search suggest drop-down list
 Solver (computer science)
Spamdexing
SQL
Text mining

References 

Information retrieval systems